Limmy's Other Stuff is a Scottish surreal comedy sketch show broadcast on BBC Scotland, written, directed by and starring Brian "Limmy" Limond, in which he introduces a chronological compilation of his non-TV material, from his early pre-YouTube sketches, to his Vines, to his present day livestreaming.

Limmy has confirmed 'Limmy's Other Stuff' will be his last television project with his focus now becoming a full-time streamer on Twitch. Limmy who has previously spoken of his mental health struggles and suicidal impulses explained "doing the telly stuff has made me fucking suicidal. Each series, pretty much, made me suicidal"

Reception 
In a review for The Herald, Alison Rowat said "This half hour is a masterclass in the art of making something out of nothing." Limmy's Other Stuff was The Sunday Times Demand Pick of the Week for 18 October 2020.

References

External links 
 

2020 Scottish television series debuts
BBC Scotland television shows
BBC television comedy
BBC Scotland television sketch shows
2020 establishments in Scotland
British surreal comedy television series